The Curtiss-Wright KD2C Skeet was an American target drone produced by Curtiss-Wright for the United States Navy that began development in 1945. The KD2C-1 first flew in 1947, however it was found unsatisfactory and the program was cancelled in 1949.

Design and development
The KD2C was a target drone, powered by a pulsejet engine and intended for air-launch for use in fleet gunnery training. The KD2C-1 was powered by a Continental pulsejet engine,  in diameter; the KD2C-2 used a McDonnell J-9 or J-11 pulsejet of the same diameter. Control was provided by a radio command system, assisted by a gyrostabilizer.

Operational history
Begun in August 1945, the first prototype KD2C flew for the first time in 1947. The Skeet's internally mounted pulsejet proved unsatisfactory, however, as it produced low speed and high fuel consumption in both wind tunnel and flight tests at the Navy's Missile Test Center at Point Mugu, California. As a result, the KD2C program was cancelled in 1949, and the last of the produced aircraft were out of service by 1951.

Surviving aircraft
The U.S. Navy donated a surviving KD2C-2 to the National Air and Space Museum in 1971; it is on display in the Steven F. Udvar-Hazy Center.

Variants
KD2C-1
Baseline model with Continental pulsejet engine.

KD2C-2
Modified KD2C-1 with McDonnell pulsejet engine.

XKD3C-1
Developed KD2C with improved engine.

Specifications (KD2C-2)

See also

References

1940s United States special-purpose aircraft
Target drones of the United States
Pulsejet-powered aircraft
KD2C
Single-engined jet aircraft
Aircraft first flown in 1947
Low-wing aircraft
Triple-tail aircraft